Tim Laszlo Walter (born 8 November 1975) is a German football coach, who coaches Hamburger SV.

Coaching career
In June 2019, Walter became the new head coach of VfB Stuttgart. He was sacked on 23 December 2019. He was named the new head coach of Hamburger SV from the 2021–22 season on.

Managerial statistics

References

External links

Living people
1975 births
German football managers
FC Bayern Munich II managers
Holstein Kiel managers
VfB Stuttgart managers
Hamburger SV managers
2. Bundesliga managers
People from Bruchsal
Sportspeople from Karlsruhe (region)